The 1955 Washington Huskies football team was an American football team that represented the University of Washington during the 1955 college football season. In its third and final season under head coach John Cherberg, the team compiled a 5–4–1 record, fifth in the Pacific Coast Conference, and was outscored 141 to 93. Bob McNamee was the team captain.

After months of unrest among players and revelations about unchecked boosters, Cherberg was dismissed in late January, Athletic director Harvey Cassill resigned two weeks later; his successor, George Briggs, hired Mississippi State head coach Darrell Royal in late February to lead the Husky football program in 1956.

The November 12 game against UCLA was referenced in the 1989 film, Back to the Future Part II; The older Biff Tannen traveled back in time to give his younger self a sports almanac, and he referenced this game to verify its accuracy.

Schedule

NFL Draft selections
One University of Washington Husky was selected in the 1956 NFL Draft, which lasted thirty rounds with 360 selections.

References

Washington
Washington Huskies football seasons
Washington Huskies football